Grevillea pythara, commonly known as Pythara grevillea, is a species of flowering plant in the family Proteaceae and is endemic to a restricted part of the South West region of Western Australia. It is a low, suckering shrub with linear to narrowly elliptic leaves and small groups of red flowers.

Description
Both surfaces of the leaves are covered with shaggy hairs pressed against the surface. Flowering mainly occurs occurs from July to December.<ref name=FB>{{FloraBase|name=Grevillea pythara|id=13941}}</ref>

TaxonomyGrevillea pythara was first formally described in 1994 by Peter Olde and Neil Marriott in the journal Nuytsia from specimens collected by Olde near Pithara in 1992. The species was discovered by Jan Wellburn, who requested that the specific epithet be named after her father's farm "Pythara", where the species grows near one of its boundaries.

Distribution and habitat
Fewer than 300 plants are known near Dalwallinu growing in weedy remnant vegetation on a disturbed road reserve.

Conservation statusGrevillea pythara is listed as "endangered" under the Australian Government Environment Protection and Biodiversity Conservation Act 1999'' and as "Threatened" by the Western Australian Government Department of Biodiversity, Conservation and Attractions, meaning that it is in danger of extinction. The threats to the species include its small population size, severe weed infestation, trampling by stock and road maintenance.

See also
 List of Grevillea species

References

pythara
Proteales of Australia
Eudicots of Western Australia
Endemic flora of Western Australia
Plants described in 1994